Chapel FM (formerly East Leeds FM) is a community radio station based in Leeds, West Yorkshire, England. The station started in 2003 when Heads Together, a Huddersfield-based community arts organisation, joined forces with local ease Leeds high school John Smeaton. The two organisations had worked together previously on a number of projects. When the idea of a radio station was tabled, pupils, teachers and Heads Together staff agreed to create one.

Very quickly it was extended to young people from primary and high schools all round East Leeds, and interested adults; it is listened to by people of all ages. The station covers the broadcasting of Garforth Arts Festival.

External links
 Official East Leeds FM Website

 

Radio stations established in 2003
Radio stations in Yorkshire
Mass media in Leeds